Ivan Dmitriyevich Lomayev (born 21 January 1999) is a Russian football player who plays for PFC Krylia Sovetov Samara.

Club career
He made his debut in the Russian Professional Football League for FC Chertanovo Moscow on 30 May 2016 in a game against FC Lokomotiv Liski. He made his Russian Football National League debut for Chertanovo on 17 July 2018 in a game against FC Rotor Volgograd.

He made his Russian Premier League debut for PFC Krylia Sovetov Samara on 25 July 2021 in a game against FC Akhmat Grozny.

International career
Lomayev was called up to the Russia national football team for the first time for a friendly against Kyrgyzstan in September 2022.

Career statistics

References

External links
 
 
 Profile by Russian Professional Football League

1999 births
Living people
People from Kemerovo
Sportspeople from Kemerovo Oblast
Russian footballers
Association football goalkeepers
Russia youth international footballers
Russia under-21 international footballers
FC Chertanovo Moscow players
PFC Krylia Sovetov Samara players
Russian Premier League players
Russian First League players
Russian Second League players